Ark John Keats Academy is a co-educational all-through school and sixth form located in the Enfield Wash area of London, England.

It is a free school educating primary and Secondary school pupils, and is sponsored by Ark Schools. The school is named after John Keats, the poet.

Ark John Keats Academy is located on the site which used to house Albany School until it closed in 2009. The site then housed Oasis Academy Hadley until that school relocated to Ponders End in 2013.

References

External links

Enfield, London
Free schools in London
2013 establishments in England
Educational institutions established in 2013
Primary schools in the London Borough of Enfield
Secondary schools in the London Borough of Enfield
Ark schools